Puffinus is a genus of seabirds in the order Procellariiformes that contains about 20 small to medium-sized shearwaters. Two other shearwater genera are named: Calonectris, which comprises three or four large shearwaters, and Ardenna with another seven species (formerly often included within Puffinus).

The taxonomy of this group is the cause of much debate, and the number of recognised species varies with the source.

The species in this group are long-winged birds, dark brown or black above, and white to dark brown below. They are pelagic outside the breeding season. They are most common in temperate and cold waters.

These tubenose birds fly with stiff wings, and use a shearing flight technique to move across wave fronts with the minimum of active flight. Some small species, such as the Manx shearwater, are cruciform in flight, with their long wings held directly out from their bodies.

Many are long-distance migrants, perhaps most spectacularly the sooty and short-tailed shearwaters, which perform migrations of 14,000 km or more each year.

Puffinus shearwaters come to islands and coastal cliffs only to breed. They are nocturnal at the colonial breeding sites, preferring moonless nights to minimise predation. They nest in burrows and often give eerie contact calls on their night-time visits. They lay a single white egg.

They feed on fish, squid and similar oceanic food. Some will follow fishing boats to take scraps, notably the sooty shearwater; these species also commonly follow whales to feed on fish disturbed by them.

Taxonomy
The genus Puffinus was introduced by the French zoologist Mathurin Jacques Brisson in 1760 with the Manx shearwater (Puffinus puffinus) as the type species.

Traditionally, Puffinus has been grouped with the Procellaria and Calonectris shearwaters. However, more recent results have determined that the genus is apparently paraphyletic and while in part very close to Calonectris, forms a clade with the genera Pseudobulweria and Lugensa, which were formerly presumed to be gadfly petrels, and can be divided in what has been called the "Puffinus" and the "Neonectris" group after notable species; the latter has been separated as a distinct genus named Ardenna. The former is taxonomically confusing, with species having been split and remerged in the last years.

Puffinus is a New Latin loanword based on the English "puffin". The original Latin term for shearwaters was usually the catchall name for sea-birds, mergus. "Puffin" and its variants, such as  poffin, pophyn and puffing, 
referred to the cured carcass of the fat nestling of the shearwater, a former delicacy. The original usage dates from at least 1337, but from as early as 1678 the term gradually came to be used for another, unrelated, seabird, the Atlantic puffin, an auk. The current English name was first recorded in 1835 and refers to the former nesting of this species on the Isle of Man.

Extant species
The genus Puffinus contains the following 21 species:

Phylogeny
Phylogeny of the genus based on a study by Joan Ferrer Obiol and collaborators published in 2022. Only 14 of the 21 recognised species were included.

Fossil record
 
Several fossil species which became extinct long ago are also known. The proportion of larger ("Neonectris") species apparently was larger before the Pliocene, i.e. before marine mammals diversified:
 "Puffinus" group
 Menorcan shearwater, Puffinus sp. (prehistoric) – possibly extirpated population of extant species; tentatively placed in this group
 Dune shearwater or Hole's shearwater, Puffinus holeae (prehistoric)
 Lava shearwater or Olson's shearwater, Puffinus olsoni (prehistoric) –  tentatively placed in this group
 Bermuda shearwater, Puffinus parvus (extinct) –  tentatively placed in this group
 Scarlett's shearwater, Puffinus spelaeus (prehistoric)
 Puffinus tedfordi (Pleistocene of western North America)
 Puffinus nestori (Late Pliocene/Early Pleistocene of Ibiza)
 "Neonectris" group
 Puffinus conradi (Early Miocene of Calvert County, US)
 Puffinus cf. tenuirostris (Late Miocene/Early Pliocene of Lee Creek Mine, US)
 Puffinus sp. 1 (Late Miocene/Early Pliocene of Lee Creek Mine, US)
 Puffinus sp. 2 (Late Miocene/Early Pliocene of Lee Creek Mine, US)
 Puffinus pacificoides (Pleistocene of Saint Helena, Atlantic)
 Unassigned
 ?Puffinus raemdonckii (Early Oligocene of Belgium) – formerly in Larus
 Puffinus micraulax (Early Miocene of C Florida, US) – probably "Puffinus" group
 Puffinus sp. (Early Miocene of Calvert County, US)
 Puffinus sp. (Early Pliocene of South Africa)
 Puffinus felthami (Pleistocene of W North America)
 Puffinus kanakoffi (Pleistocene of W North America)

"Puffinus" arvernensis (Early Miocene of France) is now considered a primitive albatross of the fossil genus Plotornis.

See also
List of extinct birds

References

Further reading

 Brooke, M. (2004): Albatrosses and Petrels Across the World. Oxford University Press, Oxford, UK. 

 
Bird genera
Taxa named by Mathurin Jacques Brisson